Spumaretrovirinae, commonly called spumaviruses (Latin for "foam") or foamyviruses, is a subfamily of the Retroviridae family. Spumaviruses are exogenous viruses that have specific morphology with prominent surface spikes. The virions contain significant amounts of double-stranded full-length DNA, and assembly is rather unusual in these viruses.  Spumaviruses are unlike most enveloped viruses in that the envelope membrane is acquired by budding through the endoplasmic reticulum instead of the cytoplasmic membrane.  Some spumaviruses, including the equine foamy virus (EFV), bud from the cytoplasmic membrane.

Some examples of these viruses are simian foamy virus and the human foamy virus.

While spumaviruses will form characteristic large vacuoles in their host cells while in vitro, there is no disease association in vivo.

References

Further reading

External links
 
 
 Viralzone: "Spumavirus"

Spumaviruses
de:Spumaviren
es:Spumavirus